Kazuyoshi Sekine (関根和美 Sekine Kazuyoshi), also known as Kazumi Sekine, is a Japanese film director, a dramatist, and a movie producer and the president of Sekine Production production company (関根プロ).

He mainly directs movies produced by independent film studios.

He is married to the actress Izumi Aki, who has appeared in his films.

Many of his films are urban love stories.

External links

JMDb profile (in Japanese)
Sekine Production

Japanese film directors
Pink film directors
Living people
Year of birth missing (living people)